Konkylie is the second studio album by Danish electropop band When Saints Go Machine. It was released on 6 June 2011 by Studio !K7.

Critical reception
Konkylie was met with "generally favorable" reviews from critics. At Metacritic, which assigns a weighted average rating out of 100 to reviews from mainstream publications, this release received an average score of 74 based on 9 reviews.

In a review for Drowned in Sound, critic reviewer John Brainlove wrote: "Konkylie is an impressive, accomplished collection of songs from a band coming into their own. They've succeeded in accomplishing what all so many artists strive for: cleanly synthesising their feelings and thoughts into sound." At MusicOMH, Ben Edgell said: "Konkylie is a vibrant, often intense, mix of house and pop, infused, wonderfully, with both a spiritual glow and a dark clubland soul."

Accolades

Track listing

Charts

References

External links
 
 

2011 albums
Studio !K7 albums